Pungeleria is a genus of moths in the family Geometridae described by Rougemont in 1903.

Selected species
Pungeleria capreolaria (Denis & Schiffermuller, 1775)

References

Campaeini